Yelbulaktamak (Yılbolaqtaqmaq) is a rural locality (a selo) and the administrative centre of Yelbulaktamaksky Selsoviet, Bizhbulyaksky District, Bashkortostan, Russia. The population was 623 as of 2010. There are 9 streets.

Geography 
Yelbulaktamak is located 24 km south of Bizhbulyak (the district's administrative centre) by road. Kachkinovo is the nearest rural locality.

References 

Rural localities in Bizhbulyaksky District